Poeni is a commune in Teleorman County, Muntenia, Romania. It is composed of seven villages: Banov, Brătești, Cătunu, Poeni, Preajba, Țăvârlău and Vătași.

References

Communes in Teleorman County
Localities in Muntenia